"Clair de lune", ("Moonlight") Op. 46 No 2, is a song by Gabriel Fauré, composed in 1887 to words by Paul Verlaine.

History
Fauré's 1887 setting of the poem was for voice and piano; but in 1888, at the instigation of the Princesse de Polignac, he made a version for voice and orchestra, first performed at the Société Nationale de Musique in April of that year, with the tenor Maurice Bàges as soloist. In its orchestral form the song was included in Fauré's incidental music Masques et bergamasques in 1919. The original published version (Hamelle, Paris, 1888) is in B-flat minor. The song is dedicated to Fauré's friend the painter Emmanuel Jadin, who was a talented amateur pianist.

The pianist Graham Johnson notes that it closes Fauré's second period and opens the doors into his third. Johnson notes that it is "for many people the quintessential French mélodie".

Lyric
The lyric is from Paul Verlaine's early collection Fêtes galantes (1869). It inspired not only Fauré but Claude Debussy, who set it in 1881 and wrote a well known piano piece inspired by it in 1891.

Notes references and sources

Notes

References

Sources

External links

Compositions by Gabriel Fauré
Mélodies
1887 compositions
Musical settings of poems by Paul Verlaine